Predstruge is a village northwest of Videm in the Municipality of Dobrepolje in Slovenia. The area is part of the historical region of Lower Carniola and is now included in the Central Slovenia Statistical Region.

Transport

References

External links
Predstruge on Geopedia

Populated places in the Municipality of Dobrepolje